Jonathan Leshnoff (born September 8, 1973) is an American classical music composer and pedagogue.

Early life and education 

Born on September 8, 1973, Jonathan Leshnoff was born to Susan and Steven Leshnoff in New Brunswick, New Jersey. His mother, Susan Leshnoff is an artist, and his father, Stephen Leshnoff, is an engineer. For his undergraduate studies, Leshnoff attended both Johns Hopkins University and the Peabody Conservatory concurrently, earning two bachelor's degrees in Anthropology and Music Composition, respectively. He went on to receive a Master’s of Music from the Peabody Conservatory, and attended the University of Maryland to receive his Doctorate of Music. As a child, Leshnoff was raised observing Conservative Judaism. Through his time at Johns Hopkins, he delved deeper into his beliefs and transitioned into following Orthodox Judaism.

Career 

Currently, Leshnoff lives in Baltimore, Maryland where he works as a composer and is a Professor of Music at Towson University. He has composed over 74 works  including four symphonies, twelve concerti, four string quartets, four oratorios, and over 15 orchestral works. His compositions have been performed by over 80 orchestras worldwide including the Atlanta Symphony Orchestra,  Baltimore Symphony Orchestra, Dallas Symphony Orchestra, Kansas City Symphony, Nashville Symphony Orchestra, Philadelphia Orchestra, and Pittsburgh Symphony Orchestra, among many others. Leshnoff's compositions have also been premiered by classical music's most celebrated soloists, including Gil Shaham, Roberto Díaz, Johannes Moser, Manuel Barrueco, and Joyce Yang.

Notable commissions include his "Clarinet Concerto”, “Zohar Oratorio", “Violin Concerto No.2”,  and “Piano Concerto.” “Clarinet Concerto" was commissioned by the Philadelphia Orchestra and the Santa Barbara Symphony and premiered in April 2016  with the orchestra and Principal Clarinetist Ricardo Morales under Music Director Yannick Nezet-Seguin.  “Zohar Oratorio" was co-commissioned by Carnegie Hall and the Atlanta Symphony Orchestra and was premiered with conductor Robert Spano in April 2016 and subsequently recorded by the Atlanta Symphony. The Dallas Symphony Orchestra and Harrisburg Symphony co-commissioned Leshnoff’s 2nd Violin Concerto, and Dallas premiered the work with DSO concertmaster in May 2018 on Maestro Jaap van Zweden's final concert as Music Director of the orchestra. It has subsequently been recorded with Noah Bendix-Balgley and the Oklahoma City Philharmonic and will be released on Naxos in 2023. In November 2019, soloist Joyce Yang premiered his “Piano Concerto” with the Kansas City Symphony and Music Director Michael Stern, and subsequently recorded the work for Reference Recordings label. 

There are eight albums exclusively featuring Leshnoff's music, including several discs on the Naxos American Classics label and a 2016 recording of two major Leshnoff works with the Atlanta Symphony Orchestra. In May 2020, Reference Recordings released a disc featuring the world premiere performance of Leshnoff's Double Concerto for Clarinet and Bassoon by the Pittsburgh Symphony Orchestra and conductor Manfred Honeck, which made it to the top of the classical Billboard charts.

While a large percentage of his work is orchestral, Leshnoff has composed for many small ensembles and concert bands. Band performances of Leshnoff's works include the United States Marine Band, which include a 2023 commission for the 250th anniversary of the USMB, as well as a transcription of Leshnoff's Clarinet Concerto on its 2017 Arioso recording. The United States Navy Band, US Air Force Band, Frost School of Music Band and Towson University Symphonic Band have also performed his band works.

Leshnoff has been at Towson University for over 20 years where he has taught orchestration, contemporary music history, music entrepreneurship and theory. He has entrusted all of his manuscripts to the special collections archive at Cook Library. In addition to his position at Towson University, he was the 2013 recipient of the University System of Maryland Regents Award in Scholarship. A recognition awarded to a faculty member from the entire University of Maryland system for significant publication profile.

Awards and recognition 

In late 2019, the Nashville Symphony's album—released in May 2019— featuring his works, including his fourth symphony commissioned by the symphony in collaboration with the Violins of Hope, was nominated for a GRAMMY Award for Best Classical Compendium. In an independent study, the Baltimore Symphony Orchestra found Leshnoff to be among the top ten most performed living composers internationally (tied for 7th) among American orchestras in the 2015–16 season.

Selected works

Leshnoff's catalog includes over 74 works, including four symphonies, fourteen concerti, and five oratorios.

 Symphony No. 1: Forgotten Chants and Refrains (2004)
 Violin Concerto No. 1 (2005)
 Double Concerto for Violin, Viola, and Orchestra (2007)
 Rush (2008)
 Starburst (2010)
 Concerto for Two Percussionists and Orchestra (2011)
 Hope: An Oratorio (2011)
 Cello Concerto (2012)
 Symphony No. 2: Innerspace (2014)
 Zohar Oratorio (2015)
 Chamber Concerto for Violin and Orchestra (2015)
 Symphony No. 3 (2015)
 Clarinet Concerto (2015)
 Symphony No. 4, "Heichalos" (2017)
 Violin Concerto No. 2 (2017)
 Piano Concerto (2019)
Of Thee I Sing (2020)
Symphony for Winds (2023)

Discography

, eleven major recordings of Leshnoff's work have been released:

Reference Recordings, Tchaikovsky: Symphony No. 4 & Leshnoff: Double Concerto for Clarinet and Bassoon, Pittsburgh Symphony Orchestra, Manfred Honeck conductor, Michael Rusinek and Nancy Goeres, soloists 
 Naxos, Jonathan Leshnoff: Symphony No. 4 ‘Heichalos,’ Guitar Concerto, Starburst, Nashville Symphony, Giancarlo Guerrero conductor, Jason Vieaux, guitar 
Naxos, “American Classics” Series: Violin Concerto, String Quartet #1, Distant Reflections, Baltimore Chamber Orchestra, Markand Thakar conductor, Carpe Diem String Quartet.
Reference Recordings, Symphony No. 3 & Piano Concerto, Kansas City Symphony, Michael Stern, conductor, Joyce Yang and Stephen Powell, soloists 
Naxos, “American Classics” Series: Symphonic Music of J. Leshnoff, IRIS Orchestra, Michael Stern conductor.
Naxos, “American Classics” Series: Chamber Music of J. Leshnoff, IRIS Orchestra catalogue number: 8.559398.
MSR Classics: String Quartets No. 3 and 4 and Four Dances, performed by the Carpe Diem String Quartet.
MSR Classics: Cosmic Echoes, performed by Steven Hendrickson and William Neil.
ASO Media, “World Premiere Recordings” Series: Zohar and Symphony No. 2 “Innerspace,” Atlanta Symphony Orchestra, Robert Spano, conductor, Jessica Rivera and Nmon Ford, soloists 
United States Marine Band “Arioso”, Col. Jason K. Fettig, Ricardo Morales, clarinet 
  Naxos, “Berkely, Brahms, Leshnoff Horn Trios,” Alexander Kerr, David Cooper, Orion Weiss.

References

Further reading

External links
 

1973 births
21st-century American composers
Living people
21st-century classical composers
21st-century American male musicians
Jewish classical composers
Musicians from New Brunswick, New Jersey
Johns Hopkins University alumni
Peabody Institute alumni
University System of Maryland alumni
Towson University faculty